Brazilian destroyer Paraíba may refer to:

 , a 
  (pennant number D28), the former American  USS Davidson (FF-1045); acquired by the Brazilian Navy in 1989 and classed as a destroyer; decommissioned in 2001; sunk en route to scrappers in India in 2005

Brazilian Navy ship names